Mark Neary Donohue Jr. (March 18, 1937 – August 19, 1975), nicknamed "Captain Nice," and later "Dark Monohue," was an American race car driver and engineer known for his ability to set up his own race car as well as driving it to victories.

Donohue is probably best known as the driver of the 1500+ bhp "Can-Am Killer" Porsche 917-30 and as the winner of the Indianapolis 500 in 1972. Cars that Donohue raced include: AMC Javelin, AMC Matador, Chevrolet Camaro, Eagle-Offy, Elva Courier, Ford GT40 MK IV, Ferrari 250LM, Ferrari 512, Lola T70, Lola T330, Lotus 20, McLaren M16, Porsche 911, Porsche 917/10, Porsche 917/30, Shelby Cobra, and Shelby Mustang GT350R.

Early life
Born in Haddon Township, New Jersey, Donohue grew up in Summit, graduated from the Pingry School in Hillside, and entered Brown University in Providence, Rhode Island. At the age of twenty-two, while a senior at Brown, Donohue began racing his 1957 Corvette. He won the first event he entered, a hillclimb in Belknap County, New Hampshire. He graduated from Brown in 1959 with a bachelor's degree in mechanical engineering.

Donohue won the SCCA national championship in an Elva Courier in 1961. An experienced race driver named Walt Hansgen (who worked for Inskip Motors in New York & Rhode Island) recognized Donohue's ability and befriended him, eventually providing an MGB (through Inskip Motors in Providence, RI and prepped by their race shop Competition Engineering) for Donohue to race at the 1964 Bridgehampton 
 SCCA endurance event, which he won. Hansgen arranged for Donohue to become his teammate in 1965, co-driving a Ferrari 275 at the 12 Hours of Sebring endurance race, which they finished in 11th place. That year, Donohue also won two divisional championships: in SCCA B Class in a GT350 and in SCCA Formula C in a Lotus 20B.

Donohue was hired on March 29, 1964, by Jack Griffith [Griffith Motors, Syosset, N.Y./Plainview, N.Y.] as design engineer for the Griffith, formerly TVR Grantura Mk III, powered by a Ford 289 cid (4.7l) V8 engine. He went on to assist TVR's David Hives in designing the Series 400 Griffith and then working on the ill-fated Bob Cumberford-designed, Intermeccanica-(Torino, Italy) produced Series 600 Griffith.
During its production life, there were 192 Series 200 Griffiths built, 59 of the Series 400 and only 10 of the Series 600.
During his stay at Griffith Mark drove the Griffith-owned Shelby 289 Cobra making his mark on the SCCA circuit.
In February of '65 Donohue was named as comptroller at Griffith Motors but was soon spirited away from Griffith by Roger Penske early in 1966.
The Griffith company closed its doors in November, 1966.

Ford GT40 and joining with Penske
In 1966, thanks to his friendship with Hansgen, word quickly spread to the Ford Motor Company about the young driver. Ford immediately signed Donohue to drive one of their GT-40 Mk II race cars campaigned at the 24 Hours of Le Mans by the Holman & Moody racing team.  Le Mans proved frustrating for Donohue.  Hansgen died while testing the GT40 in preparation for Le Mans so Donohue partnered with Australian Paul Hawkins.  Donohue and Hawkins completed only twelve laps due to differential failure and finished 47th. Earlier that year, co-driving with Hansgen, Donohue finished third at the 24 Hours of Daytona and second at the 12 Hours of Sebring.

At Hansgen's funeral, Roger Penske spoke to Donohue about driving for him. In his first race for Penske, at Watkins Glen in June 1966, Donohue qualified well but crashed the car at the top of a hill, destroying it.

Donohue was invited back to Le Mans by Ford in 1967. Ford had developed a new GT, the Mark IV. Donohue co-drove in the No. 4 yellow car with sports car driver and race car builder Bruce McLaren for Shelby American Racing. The two drivers disagreed on many aspects of racing and car setup, but as a team were able to muster a fourth-place finish in the endurance classic.

In 1967, Penske contacted Donohue about driving Penske's brand new Lola T70 spyder in the United States Road Racing Championship.  Donohue dominated the 1967 race, driving a Lola T70 MkIII Chevrolet for Penske. Donohue raced in seven of the eight races that year, winning six (at Las Vegas, Riverside, Bridgehampton, Watkins Glen, Pacific Raceways, and Mid-Ohio) and finishing third at the Laguna Seca Raceway round behind Lothar Motschenbacher and Mike Goth.

In 1968, Donohue and Penske returned to defend their USRRC championship with the McLaren M6A Chevrolet. Donohue did not start the first race of the year at Circuit Hermanos Rodriguez in Mexico City due to problems getting the engine to start. Despite this, Donohue still dominated the series, even though he suffered three DNFs during the season due to mechanical problems with the M6A.

Trans-Am
Donohue began his Trans-Am series campaign in 1967, winning three of twelve races in a Roger Penske-owned Chevrolet Camaro. In 1967 and 1968, Trans-Am schedule included two of the most prized endurance races in the world, the 24 Hours of Daytona and the 12 Hours of Sebring. Donohue finished fourth at Daytona and won the Trans-Am class at the 12 Hours of Sebring.

1968 would be a banner year for Donohue in the Trans-Am series, as he successfully defended his 12 Hours of Sebring victory by partnering with Craig Fisher and driving his Penske Chevrolet Camaro to victory. Donohue went on to win 10 of 13 races, a Trans-Am series record which would stand until Tommy Kendall went 11 for 13 in the 1997 Trans-Am championship, winning the first 11 races that year in his All-Sport liveried Mustang.

Donohue was considered a leading Trans-Am driver of the late 1960s and early 1970s. Had there been a Drivers' Championship in place at the time, he would have won three of them (his last in 1971) while driving Camaros in 1968 and 1969, and an AMC Javelin in 1971, all for Roger Penske Racing.

During their enormous success in Trans-Am, Penske and Donohue would begin to experiment with their Camaros. They discovered that using a drag racing trick of dipping a car in an acid bath would eat away small amounts of metal, which in turn made the car incrementally lighter, and allowed it to be driven faster. The 1967 Z-28 won its last race by lapping the entire field of cars, causing suspicion throughout the paddock.

During a post-race inspection, race stewards discovered that the car was 250 pounds lighter than the 2,800-pound minimum weight requirement. Donohue was about to have his race victory taken away for cheating, but Roger Penske stepped in. Penske warned that any disqualification would have the potential of motivating Chevrolet to pull all support for the Trans-Am series. After considering the potential consequences, the race stewards allowed Donohue's victory to stand, but the rules for the 1968 season incorporated a change whereby all cars would be weighed during the technical inspection before the race.

Penske and Donohue did not stop acid-dipping after this, however. Continuing the practice of reducing weight allowed them to place weights of certain sizes strategically in specific locations within the car, thus helping to balance the car while being driven on the limit. Acid-dipping car bodies was prevalent with competing Trans-Am teams also.

They continued to use the "lightweight" car in 1968, at the Sebring 12-hour race. They changed the grille and taillight to the 1968 model, and then painted both cars identically. They sent the legal weight car through the technical inspection with the number 15 and again with the number 16 on it. Then they put both cars in the race, number 15 and 16, one car being 250 pounds lighter. They won the race, finished third overall, and went on to win 10 out of 13 races that year.

They also acid-dipped the body on the Camaro and had to caution people not to lean against it, for fear it would dent. The lightweight car was featured on an episode of Dream Car Garage on Speed TV in 2005.

In 1970 new Javelin team owner Roger Penske and driver Mark Donohue would breathe new life into the AMC team. Donohue drove the Javelin to three victories, with AMC finishing second overall in the Manufacturers' Championship. In 1971, of the ten races that the Over 2.5L Class cars participated in, Donohue won seven of them, including the final six races in a row, with AMC winning the Manufacturers' championship for the first time ever. In the final race of the season, Javelins finished in first, second and third place, with George Follmer becoming the only other Javelin driver to win besides Donohue.

Indianapolis 500

In 1969, Penske and Donohue raced in their first Indianapolis 500, with Donohue finishing seventh, winning the rookie of the year award. Donohue raced at Indianapolis each year following, finishing second in 1970 and 25th in 1971.

Donohue won in 1972, driving for Penske. The victory was the first for Penske in the Indy 500.

NASCAR

Donohue raced in several NASCAR Grand American races and a NASCAR pony car division from 1968 until 1971. In the 1972–1973 season, driving an AMC Matador for Penske Racing in NASCAR's top division, the Winston Cup Series, Donohue won the season-opening event at Riverside. That race was Penske's first NASCAR win in a long history of NASCAR participation. Although photographs of Donohue with the more aerodynamic 1974 Matador coupe exist and are published, he did not drive it in competition.

Can-Am Porsche
Between 1971 and 1972, Penske Racing (along with Donohue as the primary test and development driver) was commissioned by Porsche to help develop the 917-10 to compete in the Can-Am series. During testing at Road Atlanta, Donohue recommended larger brake ducts, believing that more cooling would slow the brakes' degradation during a race.

The Porsche engineers obliged, but the new ducts interfered with the bodywork closure pins that attached body panels to the car. The front of the car was torn away, leaving Donohue, still strapped to his safety seat, with his legs dangling outside the car. Amazingly, Donohue only suffered an internal derangement of his knee with meniscus damage and limited cruciate plus collateral ligament damage. (He was operated on at Piedmont Hospital in Atlanta by Drs. J. Funk and J. L. Watts.) George Follmer, Donohue's old Trans-Am teammate, took over testing the 917-10 for Donohue, who said:

Porsche, Penske, and Donohue quickly started the development of the 917-30, complete with a reworked aerodynamic "Paris" body and a 5.4-liter turbocharged flat-12 engine whose output could be adjusted from about 1,100 to 1,500 bhp by turning a boost knob in the cockpit. During the development of this motor, the German Porsche engineers often asked Donohue if the motor finally had enough power. He answered, "It will never have enough power until I can spin the wheels at the end of the straightaway in high gear."

On August 9, 1975, Donohue drove the 917–30 to a world closed-course speed record at the Talladega Superspeedway in Talladega, Alabama. Donohue held the record for 11 years, until it was broken by Rick Mears at Michigan International Speedway.

The 917-30 is referred to as the "Can-Am killer"  as it dominated the competition, winning all but two races of the 1973 Can-Am championship (which is an untrue statement, because OPEC killed the Can-Am series in 1975–1976). After the Arab oil embargo in 1973, it led the SCCA, IMSA and other race series to impose fuel limitations on motor sport racing as a whole, which hampered the performance of the 917/30, making it uncompetitive in the Can-Am series. Brian Redman drove it once in 1974, and that was it for the car as far as Penske campaigning it. The 917/30 generally is considered one of the most powerful and most dominant racing machines ever created.

First IROC champion

Donohue raced in the inaugural IROC series in 1973–74, racing identical, specially-prepared Porsche RSRs. In the four-race series, Donohue won the first and third of three races at Riverside and the final race of the year at Daytona. The only person to beat Donohue was his former Penske Trans-Am teammate, George Follmer. In winning the first IROC championship, Donohue beat the best racing drivers of that era from all of the major championships, such as Denny Hulme, Richard Petty, A. J. Foyt, Emerson Fittipaldi, Bobby Allison, David Pearson, Peter Revson, Bobby Unser, and Gordon Johncock.

Retirement and Formula One
The pressures of racing and designing the car took their toll on Donohue. By 1973, the "Captain Nice" nickname he had earned earlier in his career was being supplanted by the nickname "Dark Monohue".  Donohue announced that he would retire from racing after the 1973 Can-Am season. In addition, the horrific events at the 1973 Indianapolis 500 and the subsequent death of his friend, Swede Savage, pushed him to quit. His retirement was short-lived, however, as he was lured back to full-time competitive driving by Penske when he formed a Formula One team, Penske Cars Ltd, to compete in the final two events of the 1974 Formula One World Championship, and to continue competing in 1975 with the new Penske PC1.

Donohue previously had debuted in Formula One on September 19, 1971, with a Penske-sponsored McLaren at the Canadian Grand Prix at Mosport Park, finishing on the podium in third place. After coming out of retirement with his former boss, Penske, Donohue returned to Formula One, entering into the final two races of the 1974 Formula One season. Donohue finished in 12th place at the Canadian Grand Prix, but failed to finish at the United States Grand Prix.

A full season of racing for the 1975 Formula One season was planned. The 1975 season turned out to be a difficult one for Donohue and Penske.  Donohue was able to muster fifth-place finishes at the Swedish Grand Prix and the British Grand Prix, but the new Penske PC1 chassis proved problematic, as evidenced by three retirements in the first six races. At the Austrian Grand Prix, Donohue's career, along with Roger Penske's Formula One aspirations, took a tragic turn.

Death

Midway through the 1975 F1 season, Penske abandoned the troublesome PC1 and started using the March 751. Donohue recently had arrived in Austria for the Austrian Grand Prix at the Österreichring race track following the successful closed-course speed record attempt at Talladega Superspeedway in Alabama just a few days earlier. During a practice session for the race, Donohue lost control of his March after a tyre failed, sending him into the catch fencing at the fastest corner on the track, Vöest Hügel Kurve. A track marshal was killed by debris from the accident, but Donohue did not appear to be injured significantly. It is said that Donohue's head struck either a catch fencing post or the bottom of the wood frame for an advertising billboard located alongside of the racetrack. A headache resulted, however, and worsened. After going to the hospital in Graz the next day, Donohue lapsed into a coma from a cerebral hemorrhage and died. He was survived by his wife and two sons from his first marriage. Donohue is buried at St. Teresa Cemetery in Summit, New Jersey.

Commemorations and legacy 
In 2003, in commemoration of Penske Racing's 50th NASCAR win, Nextel Cup driver Ryan Newman drove a Dodge Intrepid painted to resemble Donohue's 1973 AMC (with a No. 12 and current Alltel decals) at the fall Rockingham, North Carolina, race.

Penske's new Penske Racing complex in Mooresville, North Carolina is decorated with various murals of Donohue and his racing cars, most notably the AMC stock car and the various Porsche prototypes that Donohue drove through his career.

Donohue chronicled his entire racing career in the book, The Unfair Advantage (co-written with noted motorsports and engineering journalist Paul Van Valkenburgh). The book documents his career from his first races to his final full season of racing the year before he was killed. This was not merely a celebrity autobiography, but a detailed, step-by-step record of the engineering approach he took to getting the absolutely highest performance from every car he drove, always looking for that elusive "unfair advantage". Donohue (along with Penske) were pioneers in many rights, some as notable as the use of a skidpad as a tool for developing and perfecting race car suspension designs and setups. The book told how Donohue learned to exploit the antilock braking system and the powerful turbocharged engine of several prototype Porsches, as well as how he learned from various mishaps, including a near-fatal crash. The book was published shortly before Donohue's death.

The book was re-released in 2000 by Bentley Publishers (Cambridge, Massachusetts). It includes information and additional photography that was not available before the first edition was published.

Donohue's racing tradition is carried on by his son, David Donohue, a successful road racer in his own right.

Awards
Drexel University presented Mark Donohue with its Engineering and Science Award in 1973.
Mark Donohue was inducted into the International Motorsports Hall of Fame in 1990.
He was also inducted in the Motorsports Hall of Fame of America in 1990.
He was inducted in the Sports Car Club of America Hall of Fame in its 2006 class.

Motorsports career results

SCCA National Championship Runoffs

Formula One World Championship
(key)

Formula One Non-Championship
(key)

Complete USAC Championship Car results

Indianapolis 500 results

NASCAR

Winston Cup Series

Daytona 500

International Race of Champions
(key) (Bold – Pole position. * – Most laps led.)

Complete Canadian-American Challenge Cup results
(key) (Races in bold indicate pole position) (Races in italics indicate fastest lap)

Complete 24 Hours of Le Mans results

See also
Roger Penske
Indianapolis Motor Speedway
George Follmer
Walt Hansgen
Skidpad
Turbocharger
Brown University
Lola Cars
Vehicle Dynamics
Elva (car manufacturer)

References

External links

 Mark Donohue's IROC and NASCAR stats at racing-reference.info
 Mark Donohue Photos
 Road Racing Drivers Club see – deceased members bio list – biography and photograph (includes biographies of all ever invited to join Road Racing Drivers Club, living and deceased)
 AMX-perience Mark Donohue Tribute Page
 Jayski's Mark Donohue tribute
 The Greatest 33

1937 births
1975 deaths
American Formula One drivers
Brown University School of Engineering alumni
Pingry School alumni
NASCAR drivers
Indianapolis 500 drivers
Indianapolis 500 Rookies of the Year
Indianapolis 500 winners
Trans-Am Series drivers
International Motorsports Hall of Fame inductees
International Race of Champions drivers
People from Haddon Township, New Jersey
Sportspeople from Summit, New Jersey
Racing drivers from New Jersey
Racing drivers who died while racing 
Penske Formula One drivers
Sport deaths in Austria
Burials in New Jersey
24 Hours of Le Mans drivers
24 Hours of Daytona drivers
World Sportscar Championship drivers
SCCA National Championship Runoffs winners
Team Penske drivers
Porsche Motorsports drivers